John A. Meredith (March 4, 1814  – March 15, 1882) was a nineteenth-century American  politician and judge from Virginia.

Early life
Meredith was born in New Kent County, Virginia, in 1814.

Career

Soon after his admission to the bar in Hanover County, Virginia, Meredith was appointed Commonwealth's Attorney there, holding that position until about 1850.

In 1850, Meredith was elected to the Virginia Constitutional Convention of 1850. He was one of six delegates elected from the central Piedmont delegate district made up of his home district of Richmond City, and including Henrico, New Kent and Charles City Counties.

Meredith was a member of the Virginia State Senate in 1851. While a state Senator, he was elected under the new Constitution of 1850 to judge of the Circuit Court of Richmond, Virginia. He was reelected to the position again by popular vote in 1860.

Though Meredith serve as a judge during the Confederate regime 1861-1865, he was appointed to the same Richmond Circuit Court by Unionist Governor Pierpont at the close of hostilities, and was then appointed by the General Assembly to continue in his office.

During Reconstruction, Meredith was appointed as head of U.S. General Halleck's "Court of Conciliation". He held his Circuit Court judgeship until the Radical Republican Congress removed all sitting judges in Virginia in 1869 immediately prior to the new Constitution of 1870 and the end of military occupation.

Meredith returned to private law practice until his appointment as Richmond City Attorney, and he was later elected to Richmond's Board of Aldermen where he presided.

Death
Judge John A. Meredith died on March 15, 1882, in Richmond City, Virginia.

References

Bibliography

Virginia state senators
County and city Commonwealth's Attorneys in Virginia
19th-century American politicians
1814 births
1882 deaths
People from New Kent County, Virginia
People from Hanover County, Virginia